USS Wassuc is the name of a vessel, used more than once by the United States Navy:

 , a single-turreted, twin-screw monitor—was laid down in June 1863 at Portland, Maine.
 , originally a steel-hulled, coastal passenger vessel built in 1924 at Elizabethport, New Jersey.

References 

United States Navy ship names